Bluff Hill may refer to one of several hills and promontories:

Bluff Hill (Hawke's Bay), part of Napier Hill in Napier, New Zealand
Bluff Hill / Motupohue in Bluff, New Zealand
Bluff Hill (Tasmania) in Australia
Bluff Hill National Park, in Queensland, Australia
Bluff Hill Trail, in Tunkwa Provincial Park, British Columbia, Canada